A Change of Spirit is a 1912 American short silent drama film directed by D. W. Griffith and starring Blanche Sweet.

Plot

Cast
 Blanche Sweet as The Young Woman
 William J. Butler as The Young Woman's Father
 Kate Toncray as The Young Woman's Mother
 Henry B. Walthall as First Gentleman Thief
 Charles Hill Mailes as Second Gentleman Thief
 Walter Miller as The Robbery Victim
 Robert Harron as Young Man on Street
 Joseph McDermott as Policeman
 W. Chrystie Miller
 W. C. Robinson as Policeman

See also
 List of American films of 1912
 D. W. Griffith filmography
 Blanche Sweet filmography

References

External links

1912 films
American silent short films
American black-and-white films
1912 drama films
1912 short films
Films directed by D. W. Griffith
Silent American drama films
1910s American films